Chiayusuchus is an extinct genus of stomatosuchid crocodylomorph. Fossils have been found from the Xinminbao Group in Gansu, China. It existed during the Barremian and Aptian stages of the Early Cretaceous. It was in the same family as the large, flat-snouted crocodilian Stomatosuchus.

References

External links
Chiayusuchus in the Paleobiology Database

Early Cretaceous crocodylomorphs of Asia
Early Cretaceous reptiles of Asia